Albanian Basketball Supercup is an event started only from 1999 and involves the Albanian Basketball League champions and Albanian Basketball Cup winners of the previous season. The Supercup consists in a single match which is always played the year after major events have ended and right before the new season start.

The team with most trophies are PBC Tirana with 8 Supercups.

Champions
Below are the winners of the Albanian Basketball Supercup.

Ranking

References

Supercup
1999 establishments in Albania